NGC 6240, also known as the Starfish Galaxy, is a nearby ultraluminous infrared galaxy (ULIRG) in the constellation Ophiuchus. The galaxy is the remnant of a merger between three smaller galaxies. The collision between the three progenitor galaxies has resulted in a single, larger galaxy with three distinct nuclei and a highly disturbed structure, including faint extensions and loops.

Double nuclei

Star formation versus supermassive black holes

The power sources of ULIRGs in general has been greatly debated. Infrared light from galaxies generally originates from dust in the interstellar medium. ULIRGs are abnormally bright in the infrared. The infrared dust emission in ULIRGs is over one trillion times more luminous than the Sun (i.e. it has an infrared luminosity of ). Astronomers have speculated that either intense star formation regions or active galactic nuclei (which contain supermassive black holes) may be responsible for the intense dust heating that produces this emission, although the general consensus is that both may be present in most ULIRGs. Studying the exact nature of ULIRGs has been difficult, however, because the dust in the centers of these galaxies obscures both visible and near-infrared starlight and because theoretical models of both starbursts and active galactic nuclei have demonstrated that they may look similar. Because NGC 6240 is a nearby example of such a ULIRG, astronomers have studied it intensively to understand its power source.

X-ray observations

Observations performed by Stefanie Komossa and collaborators with the Chandra X-Ray Observatory have detected strong hard X-ray emission from both of the nuclei. The intensity of this emission and the presence of emission from lowly ionized or neutral iron indicate that both of the nuclei are active galactic nuclei.
Presumably, these are the black holes that were originally at the centers of the two merging galaxies. Over the course of millions of years, the two black holes are expected to come closer together and form a binary supermassive black hole.

Recent studies by Wolfram Kollatschny and collaborators using the MUSE instrument on board the VLT have revealed that there are in fact three, not two, supermassive black holes at the core of this remnant. Their masses are suggested to be 90, 710 and 360 million solar masses. Two of the three black holes are active. The additional SMBH implies that three original galaxies are merging instead of two.

Final stages 
A galaxy merger is a slow process lasting more than a billion years as two galaxies, under the inexorable pull of gravity, dance toward each other before finally joining together. After research done over the past few years, scientists have concluded that this galaxy has reached its last stages before colliding into one another. Photographic evidence proves that the two nuclei have been growing closer, and in that process, they have been emitting more gasses and stellar winds outward. Those winds evict about 100 solar masses in gases from the galaxy every year. These type of winds and growth of the black holes are known to occur during the last 10 to 20 million years of the merger; it is assumed that this is the amount of time left for the galaxy to finish its collision phase.  After this phase, the merged galaxies will become one, becoming a post-merger object until if and when any tidal tails and plumes evaporate.

Gallery

See also 

 Arp 220 – another ultraluminous infrared galaxy and merger remnant
 Antennae Galaxies – a nearby pair of merging galaxies
 NGC 520 – another merger remnant

References

External links

NGC 6240: Two Supermassive Black Holes in Same Galaxy

Irregular galaxies
Interacting galaxies
Peculiar galaxies
Luminous infrared galaxies
Ophiuchus (constellation)
6240
IC objects
10592
59186